Julian Richings (born 30 August 1956)  is a British-Canadian character actor. He has appeared in over 225 films and television series.

Career
After touring the United States with a British stage production, Richings moved to Toronto, Ontario, Canada in 1984. Within five years, he had become a regular on the second season of the War of the Worlds TV series. In the 1996 film Hard Core Logo, he played the bitter, aging, punk rock legend Bucky Haight. He appeared in the iconic opening of the 1997 film Cube. In 1999, he appeared in the science fiction film Thrill Seekers.

In 2000, he appeared as Bellanger in The Claim, and earned a Genie Award nomination for best supporting actor. He was a member of the repertory cast of the A&E TV original series A Nero Wolfe Mystery (2001–02). He played the role of Death in The CW's show Supernatural, beginning in its fifth season, and appearing again in sixth, seventh, ninth, and tenth seasons. He was also Death in the short film Dave v. Death (2011).

Richings performed in heavy makeup as Three Finger in Wrong Turn (2003), and nearly-blind security guard Otto in Stephen King's 2004 miniseries Kingdom Hospital. Dramatic roles include stagehand Mr. Turnbull in the 2004 film Being Julia. He appeared as Orr, a cruel loan shark in the 2004 Canadian film The Last Casino. In 2006, he appeared in a brief speaking role as the Mutant Theatre Organiser in X-Men: The Last Stand, and played a vampire killer alongside in the direct-to-DVD horror film The Last Sect.

In 2007, Richings played a driver in the film Shoot 'Em Up, a dissipated and aging punk rocker in The Third Eye, transvestite psychologist Dr. Heker in The Tracey Fragments, and a number of small roles in other films, including Skinwalkers and Saw IV. He appeared in the 2008 film The Timekeeper. Richings continues to be active in short films and television series, mostly in Canada. He was presented with two Dora Awards in the late 1980s, and continues to perform professionally in the Toronto area with a number of theatre groups.

In 2008, Richings was nominated for another Dora Award for his performance in The Palace of the End. He said that he had a part in the 2013 Superman film Man of Steel. When told about a campaign to see him become the next Doctor in Doctor Who, one of his favorite childhood TV shows, he said he was flattered by the idea. In 2014, he starred in the science fiction film Ejecta. In 2015, he appeared in the horror film The Witch and the drama film Reign.

Filmography

Film

Television

Video games

References

External links

Interview with Richings from 2005
Interview Julian Richings with mycoven.com, March 2014

Living people
1956 births
20th-century English male actors
21st-century English male actors
Canadian male film actors
Canadian male television actors
Canadian male voice actors
Canadian people of English descent
Canadian expatriates in England
Dora Mavor Moore Award winners
English expatriates in Canada
English male film actors
English male television actors
Male actors from Oxfordshire
Actors from Oxford